Shamit Shome (born September 5, 1997) is a Canadian professional soccer player who plays as a midfielder for Cavalry FC.

Early life
Shome, a Bengali, was born in Edmonton to Bangladeshi parents. He played youth soccer with Edmonton Southwest United SC from 2003 until 2014. While playing for the Impact, Shome studied electrical engineering at Concordia University.

Club career

FC Edmonton
Shome joined FC Edmonton's academy program in 2015. In the fall of that year he enrolled at the University of Alberta and had a standout year with the Alberta Golden Bears scoring six goals in twelve appearances. This earned him the CWUAA Rookie of the Year Award.

On February 12, 2016, Shome signed his first professional contract with FC Edmonton. He made his debut for the club on April 16 of that year, playing 80 minutes in a 1–0 loss to the Tampa Bay Rowdies. Throughout the 2016 season, Shome earned rave reviews from head coach Colin Miller, and was considered one of Canada's most exciting young prospects, getting numerous starts for one of the top clubs in the NASL.

Montreal Impact

On January 4, 2017, Major League Soccer announced that they had signed Shome to a Generation Adidas contract prior to the 2017 MLS SuperDraft, paying an undisclosed transfer fee to FC Edmonton in the process. Shome was drafted by the Montreal Impact in the second round of the draft. In October 2017, Shome made his MLS debut in the Impact's final game of the season, coming on as a substitute for Impact captain Patrice Bernier.

In March 2018, Shome was loaned to USL club Ottawa Fury, but he was recalled two weeks later due to injuries in the Impact midfield. Midway through the 2018 season, Shome began to get regular appearances off the bench, earning positive reviews. In April 2019, Shome got his first full 90 minute match against DC United, with an impressive impact on the pitch. He scored his first goal for Montreal against the New England Revolution on April 24. On May 29, Shome got his first assist to Omar Browne against Real Salt Lake. Shome would have his option for the 2020 season exercised by the Impact, keeping him with the club for 2020. At the end of the 2020 season, Shome would be released by the Impact, ending his time at the club after four seasons.

Return to FC Edmonton
On January 4, 2021, Shome returned to FC Edmonton, which by then had moved to the Canadian Premier League. On February 9, 2022, the club announced that Shome and all but two other players would not be returning for the 2022 season.

On April 5, 2022, Shome signed with Forge FC and was immediately loaned back to FC Edmonton for the 2022 season.

Cavalry FC
In January 2023, Cavalry FC announced they had signed Shome through the 2024 season, with a club option for the 2025 season.

International career

Youth

Shome was born in Canada to Bangladeshi parents – his father and mother hail from Sylhet. As a result, he is eligible to play for Bangladesh. He received his first call-up to a Canadian U18 national team camp in October 2014 while he was playing for Edmonton Southwest United. He received three further call-ups to Canadian U18 camps in 2015 and was the only university player called up to a camp in November 2015 in Mexico. Shome is still eligible to represent Bangladesh at senior level.

Shome received his first Canadian U20 national team call-up in February 2016 and started in a 2–1 upset against England in an unofficial youth friendly. In August 2016, Shome was called up to the U-20 team for a pair of friendlies against Costa Rica. Shome was nominated for Canada's U-20 player of the year in 2016. In February 2017, Shome missed the 2017 CONCACAF U-20 Championship due to injury. In May 2018, Shome was named to Canada's under-21 squad for the 2018 Toulon Tournament.

Shome was named to the Canadian U-23 provisional roster for the 2020 CONCACAF Men's Olympic Qualifying Championship on February 26, 2020.

Senior
In January 2020, Shome was called up to the Canadian senior team ahead of friendlies against Barbados and Iceland. He made his debut on January 7 against Barbados as a substitute in a 4–1 victory.

Career statistics

Club

International

Honours

Club

Montreal Impact
 Canadian Championship: 2019

Individual
Canada West Rookie of the Year: 2015

References

External links
FC Edmonton profile

1997 births
Living people
Canadian soccer players
Association football midfielders
Canadian people of Bangladeshi descent
Canadian sportspeople of Asian descent
Soccer players from Edmonton
University and college soccer players in Canada
Concordia University alumni
Alberta Golden Bears players
FC Edmonton players
CF Montréal players
Ottawa Fury FC players
CF Montréal draft picks
Forge FC players
North American Soccer League players
Major League Soccer players
USL Championship players
Canadian Premier League players
Canada men's youth international soccer players
Canada men's international soccer players